Jassim Yaqoob (Arabic:جاسم يعقوب) (born 16 March 1997) is an Emirati footballer. He currently plays as a winger for Al Nasr.

External links

References

Emirati footballers
1997 births
Living people
Al-Nasr SC (Dubai) players
Khor Fakkan Sports Club players
UAE Pro League players
Association football wingers
Footballers at the 2018 Asian Games
Asian Games bronze medalists for the United Arab Emirates
Asian Games medalists in football
Medalists at the 2018 Asian Games
Emirati people of Baloch descent